Neurotherapeutics is a quarterly peer-reviewed medical journal covering research on experimental treatments of neurological disorders. It was established in 2004 and is published by Springer Science+Business Media on behalf of the American Society for Experimental NeuroTherapeutics. The editor-in-chief is Maral Mouradian (Robert Wood Johnson Medical School). The founding editor-in-chief was Alan I. Faden (University of Maryland School of Medicine).

Abstracting and indexing 
The journal is abstracted and indexed in:

According to the Journal Citation Reports, the journal has a 2020 impact factor of 7.620.

References

External links 
 

Neurology journals
Springer Science+Business Media academic journals
Quarterly journals
Publications established in 2004
English-language journals